The Serbian Figure Skating Championships are a figure skating national championship held annually to determine the national champions of Serbia (Serbia and Montenegro prior to 2006 and Yugoslavia prior to 2002).

Medalists

Men

Ladies

Pairs

Ice dance

External links
 2011–12 Serbian Championships

Figure skating national championships
Figure skating in Serbia